Lodewijk Caspar Valckenaer (Leeuwarden, 7 June 1715 – Leiden, 15 March 1785) was a Dutch classical scholar, at Leiden. He was a follower of Tiberius Hemsterhuis, and his successor in 1766 in the chair of Greek at Leiden. He was born in Leeuwarden.

The jurist and politician Johan Valckenaer (1759–1821) was his son.

Works
Ammonius. De adfinium vocabulorum differentia (Leiden 1739)
Dictata in antiquitates Graecas (1751)
Observationes philologicae in Evangelium Lucae (1751)
Observationes philologicae in Actus Apostolicos (1752)
Observationes philologicae in primam Pauli epistolam ad Corinthios (1752)
Phoenissae (1755)
Diatribe in Euripidis deperditorum dramatum reliquias (1767)
Euripidis Tragoedia Hippolytus (Commentary, 1768)

Notes

1715 births
1785 deaths
Dutch classical scholars
Classical scholars of Leiden University
People from Leeuwarden
University of Franeker alumni
Leiden University alumni
Academic staff of the University of Franeker
Academic staff of Leiden University